Zoltán Szabó (born November 24, 1965) is a professor of mathematics at Princeton University known for his work on Heegaard Floer homology.

Education and career
Szabó received his B.A. from Eötvös Loránd University in Budapest, Hungary in 1990, and he received his Ph.D. from Rutgers University in 1994.

Together with Peter Ozsváth, Szabó created Heegaard Floer homology, a homology theory for 3-manifolds. For this contribution to the field of topology, Ozsváth and Szabó were awarded the 2007 Oswald Veblen Prize in Geometry. In 2010, he was elected honorary member of the Hungarian Academy of Sciences.

Selected publications
.
.
Grid Homology for Knots and Links, American Mathematical Society, (2015)

References

External links

Personal homepage

1965 births
20th-century Hungarian mathematicians
21st-century Hungarian mathematicians
Members of the Hungarian Academy of Sciences
Living people
International Mathematical Olympiad participants
Topologists
Eötvös Loránd University alumni
Rutgers University alumni
Princeton University faculty